Gian is a masculine Italian given name. It is a variant of Gianni and is likewise used as a diminutive of Giovanni, the Italian form of John.
In Italian, any name including Giovanni can be contracted to Gian, particularly in combination with other given names, such as Gianfranco or Gianluca.

Gian is also an unrelated masculine Punjabi Sikh name meaning 'knowledge' and is a variant of the Sanskrit name Gyan.

Notable people
Notable people whose name is now typically expressed as Gian include:

 Gian Paolo Lomazzo, Italian painter
 Gian Lorenzo Bernini, Italian sculptor
 Gian Rinaldo Carli, Italian count, economist, and antiquarian
 Gian Gastone de' Medici, Grand Duke of Tuscany
 Gian Francesco Albani, Italian Catholic cardinal
 Gian Francesco Malipiero, Italian composer
 Gian Galeazzo Visconti, First Lord of Milan
 Gian Galeazzo Sforza, Sixth Lord of Milan
 Gian Marco Centinaio, Italian politician
 Gian Pyres, British musician
 Gian Maria Volonté, former actor
 Gian Sammarco, former actor
 Gian Carlo Menotti, composer and librettist
 Gian Sotto, Filipino politician
 Gian Piero Ventura, Italian football manager
 Gian Piero Gasperini, Italian football manager
 Gian (footballer, born 1974) (Giancarlo Dias Dantas), Brazilian footballer
 Gian Francesco Gonçalves Mariano, known as Gian, Brazilian footballer
 Gian (footballer, born 2001) (Gianluca Muniz Estevam), Brazilian footballer
 Gian Singh, several people

Other uses
 Gian, alternate name of Giyan, a city in Iran
 Gian, alternate name of Takeshi Goda, a character in Doraemon

See also
 Giovanni and Gianni, for other people whose names may appear as Gian
 Gianbattista
 Gianpaolo

Italian masculine given names
Sammarinese given names